Vic the Viking is a children's animated television ABC series, which began on Network Ten on 6 July 2013, and continued on Eleven on 9 November 2013. It was based on the 1974-1975 anime series Vicky the Viking. The show aired 39 episodes for a total of 78 segments, and ended in 2014.

The main characters are Vic, a young, frail and ingenious Viking boy; his father Halvar, the Captain of the Drakkar and chief elect of 'Flake' the home village, and the villagers, mainly the other plunder crewmen, including druid Urobe, the ever-quarreling companions Tjure and Snorre, the simple giant Flaxe, squeaky-voiced navigator Gorm and bard Ulme; also Vic's bossy mother Ylva, mischievous urchin-rival Gilby, who is jealous that Vic is allowed to sail with the men, and Vic's equally inquisitive little cousin, Ylvi. Halvar's sworn enemy is the rascally captain Sven and his crew of incompetent oafs, but most episodes have other antagonists.

The series has been aired overseas, as in Flanders by Ketnet since autumn 2013 (dubbed in Dutch). In the UK it is aired on Pop.

Series overview

Season 1 (2013)

References

External links
 IMDb, with episode summaries

2013 Australian television series debuts
2010s Australian animated television series
Animated television series about children
Australian children's animated action television series
Australian children's animated comedy television series
Australian computer-animated television series
English-language television shows
Network 10 original programming
10 Peach original programming
Australian Broadcasting Corporation original programming
Fictional Vikings
Television series set in the Viking Age